Mona Lisa Descending a Staircase is a 1992 American animated short by Joan C. Gratz.

Summary
Consisting of 2-D claymation, it features famous paintings morphing into each other.

List of artists featured
The works of several artists are featured in the transition:
Vincent van Gogh
Chuck Close
Pablo Picasso
Roy Lichtenstein
Andy Warhol
Paul Gauguin
René Magritte
Philip Gaston
Edvard Munch

Accolades
It won the 1992 Oscar for Best Animated Short Film.

Reception
New York Magazine's Vulture named the film ninth best of all 87 Oscar winning animated short films.

Availability
It was released on DVD by Hen's Tooth in 2004 alongside her other works.

It is also available for streaming.

References

External links
 
 Mona Lisa Descending a Staircase on YouTube
 Mona Lisa Descending a Staircase on BCDB

1992 films
1992 animated films
1990s animated short films
Best Animated Short Academy Award winners
Films about painters
Stop-motion animated short films
1990s English-language films
American animated short films
1990s American films